Cielito del Mundo (July 4, 1935 – January 9, 2016), also known as Mahal, was a Filipina singer, actress, civic leader, politician and television host. She was one of the original hosts of Kapwa Ko Mahal Ko, the longest running public service television program in the country (which aired on GMA Network), in 1975. She was also the host of Mahal, a similar public service program aired on Intercontinental Broadcasting Corporation (IBC-13), while acting as the chairman of her own foundation, the Mahal Foundation. Mahal also entered the politics when she was elected as councilor of Quezon City's 4th District.

Death
Del Mundo died on January 9, 2016, while in coma in a hospital in Phoenix, Arizona after she suffered massive stroke and brain tumor.

Filmography

Television
Kapwa Ko Mahal Ko (GMA, 1975-1990)
Mahal (IBC 13, 1975–1998)
Klik na Klik sa Trese (IBC 13, 1992–1997)

Films
Langit Pa Rin Kita (1967)
Basta Bisaya (1970)
Mga Ibong Pipit (1984)

See also
Kapwa Ko Mahal Ko

References

2016 deaths
Filipino film actresses
Filipino television personalities
GMA Integrated News and Public Affairs people
IBC News and Public Affairs people
1935 births